The Missouri Tigers women's basketball team represents the University of Missouri and competes in the NCAA Division I. The team plays its home games at Mizzou Arena in Columbia, Missouri, and plays in the Southeastern Conference.

Roster

History
Missouri first fielded a women's team during the 1974–1975 season. The team's best post-season result was appearing in the Sweet Sixteen (1982 and 2001).

Head coaches
Alexis Jarrett, 1974–75
Joann Rutherford, 1975–98
Cindy Stein, 1998–2010
Robin Pingeton, 2010–present

Conferences 
Missouri has played in the Big 8 and the Big 12 conferences. The Tigers joined the Big 12 in 1997 when the Big 8 merged with several former members of the defunct Southwest Conference.   Since 2012,  the team has played in the Southeastern Conference after leaving the Big 12 Conference.

Coaches 
The current head coach is Robin Pingeton, who was hired in April 2010 to replace former head coach Cindy Stein. Stein resigned effective the end of the 2010 season under pressure from fans, media, and the administration. Pingeton was the coach at Illinois State University.

Year-by-year results

Conference tournament winners noted with ‡

|-style="background: #ffffdd;"
| colspan="8" align="center" | Southeastern Conference

NCAA tournament results

See also
 2009–10 Missouri Tigers women's basketball team

References

External links